Day One is a personal journaling app available for Android, macOS and iOS devices. Some features include: data syncing with multiple devices; end-to-end encryption, Markdown authoring of entries; location, weather, date, time, and other automatic metadata; quick entry menu bar (Mac only); and reminders. 

The application has been reviewed by Macworld, The Verge, Lifehacker and other tech websites. The Mac version of Day One was chosen as "Mac App of the Year" in 2012 by the Mac App Store and won an Apple Design Award in 2014 for being "super well-designed on OS X and being exactly what it needs to be and nothing more."

Day One was acquired by Automattic, the owner of WordPress.com, on June 14, 2021.

History 
Day One had a service called Publish for publishing selected entries to a Day One-hosted webpage and sharing via Facebook, Twitter, Tumblr, and other social services.

Development 
On February 4, 2016, the developers, Bloom Built, introduced Day One 2 for Mac and iOS, citing the release as a full app rebuild. The update introduced a visual overhaul and new features such as multiple journals and photos.

End-to-End Encryption 

On June 12, 2017, Bloom Built added end-to-end encryption to Day One 2 after two years of development. The update was a culmination of the Day One Sync services launched in 2015 as a replacement for iCloud and DropBox sync.

References

External links
 
iOS App Store link

Android (operating system) software
IOS software
MacOS software
Automattic

2021 mergers and acquisitions